Jamil Buba Adam (born 5 June 1991 in the Metropolitan Borough of Bolton) is an English footballer of Nigerian and Irish descent who plays as a striker for Flint Town United, having previously played for Championship side Barnsley.

Career
Adam began his youth career with Premiership side Manchester City where he won the club's 2008 Academy Player of the Year. After leaving City, Jamil joined Championship side Barnsley and made his debut in the final game of the 2007–08 season against Cardiff City. Next season, Adam bagged a brace in the first friendly match in the 4–1 win at Buxton and the following day, he scored against Glossop North End for Barnsley.

At the end of the 2009–10 season, Jamil was named Barnsley's Young Player of the Year.

On 12 January 2011, Adam left Barnsley by mutual consent after making one league appearance for The Tykes and also making a brief substitute appearance in the FA Cup against West Ham.

International career 
Adam is eligible to play for England, Nigeria, or Ireland. He has previously been called up to Nigeria underage sides but has since made his debut for the Republic of Ireland Under-19 side and played in the UEFA Championship first qualifying stage in San Marino in November 2009 where he scored in a 5–0 victory. He scored his second goal for the U19 side in a 4–2 win over Poland Under-19s.

Jamil also represented the Republic of Under-19 side in the Clarion Hotels U19 Four Nations Tournament where he made two substitute appearances against Turkey Under-19s and Holland Under-19s.

Honours
Barnsley
2010 Young Player of the Year

References

External links

Republic of Ireland Under-19 career stats 
 Profile at Flint Town United F.C.

1991 births
People from Farnworth
Living people
Black British sportsmen
Association football forwards
English footballers
Nigerian footballers
Barnsley F.C. players
Baldock Town F.C. players
Burscough F.C. players
Buckley Town F.C. players
Penycae F.C. players
Flint Town United F.C. players
English Football League players